Wiedemannia czernyi is a species of dance flies, in the fly family Empididae.

References

Wiedemannia
Insects described in 1905
Diptera of Europe
Taxa named by Mario Bezzi